James Pearce was a college football player.

Early years
James was the son of Marvin Pearce. Marvin played both for Alabama and Auburn, including playing for Alabama in the first Iron Bowl.  Marvin's father was the Confederate general James P. Pearce.

College football
Pearce was a prominent member of Mike Donahue's 1920 Auburn Tigers football team, one of Auburn's greatest teams. The 1922 team upset defending Southern champions Centre and is also considered highly, considered best by fullback Ed Sherling. Pearce made All-Southern in 1922.

References

American football tackles
All-Southern college football players
Auburn Tigers football players